EU Med or EuroMed 9 or MED9 (formerly MED7; from EUrope Mediterranean)  which is also referred to as "Club Med" and "Med Group", is an alliance of nine Mediterranean and Southern European Union member states: Croatia, Cyprus, France, Greece, Italy, Malta, Portugal, Slovenia and Spain. They have Greco-Roman heritage and are part of the Mediterranean Basin. All nine countries are states of the European Union, part of the eurozone (euro currency), and all except Cyprus are part of the unbounded Schengen Area.

Members

History 
The Group was informally established on 17 December 2013 in Brussels at the initiative of the Foreign Ministers of Cyprus and Spain in order to create coordination on issues of common interest within the EU.

It was decided that the group would hold an annual meeting at the ministerial level. The first ministerial meeting was to take place in Greece in 2014, during Greece's presidency of the Council, but instead took place on 14 April in Alicante. 

The second meeting took place in February 2015 in Paris. The 3rd Ministerial Meeting of the Mediterranean Group took place in Cyprus in February 2016 which was also attended by the Secretary General of the Union for the Mediterranean (UfM), Fathallah Sijilmassi. The Foreign Ministers discussed security and stability issues in North Africa and the Middle East as well as the handling of the migration crisis.

The Group held its 1st Southern EU countries' Summit on 9 September 2016 at the Zappeion Palace in Athens. Following the summit, the Athens Declaration was issued calling for investment to tackle youth unemployment and support growth, as well as stronger EU cooperation on issues of security and migration. The next summit is scheduled to take place in Spain, at the Royal Palace of El Pardo.

The seventh meeting was made on 10 September 2020 in Porticcio, Corsica, and concerned Turkey's concurrent unilateral activities in the eastern Mediterranean.

In 2021 it was announced during the Prime Minister Janez Janša's visit to Greece that Slovenia will join the group with a support of France, Spain and Greece.

Croatia and Slovenia first attended the 17th September 2021 Athens meeting.

Summits 
 09 September 2016 in Athens, 
 28 January 2017 in Lisbon, 
 10 April 2017 in Madrid, 
 10 January 2018 in Rome, 
 29 January 2019 in Nicosia, 
 14 June 2019 in Valletta, 
 10 September 2020 in Porticcio (Corsica), 
 17 September 2021 in Athens, 
 09 December 2022 in Alicante,

See also 

 Craiova Group
 Three Seas Initiative
 European integration
 Multi-speed Europe
 New Hanseatic League
 Organisation of the Black Sea Economic Cooperation
 Visegrád Group

References 

Intergovernmental organizations
European integration
Southern Europe
Foreign relations of Cyprus
Foreign relations of France
Foreign relations of Italy
Foreign relations of Greece
Foreign relations of Malta
Foreign relations of Portugal
Foreign relations of Spain
Foreign relations of Croatia
Foreign relations of Slovenia
International organizations based in Europe
Bottom-up regional groups within the European Union
Euromediterranean Partnership